Men's 70 kg competition in judo at the 1972 Summer Olympics in Munich, West Germany was held at Judo and Wrestling Hall.

Results

Finals

Repechages

Pool A

Pool B

References

External links
  Official reports of the 1972 Summer Olympics

Judo at the 1972 Summer Olympics
Judo at the Summer Olympics Men's Half Middleweight